Wolf Frees, also credited as Wolfgang Müller-Frees, (8 October 1909 – 1974) was a German actor from Potsdam who worked in the British film industry. Frees left Germany in the mid-1930s as his wife was Jewish and persecuted by the Nazis. In films he usually played German military men. He had roles in The Guns of Navarone (1961), Four Horsemen of the Apocalypse (1962), Dr. Zhivago (1965) and The Saint TV series in the 1960s. His last acting credit dates to 1971.

Filmography

References

External links

Wolf Frees(Kinotv)

1909 births
1974 deaths
German male film actors
German male television actors
People from Potsdam